The Kiaka mine is one of the largest gold mines in the Burkina Faso . The mine is located in the center of the country in Zoundwéogo Province. The mine has estimated reserves of 5 million oz of gold.

References 

Gold mines in Burkina Faso